Juan Dávila may refer to:
 Juan Dávila (politician)
 Juan Davila (artist)
 Juan Manuel Dávila, Guatemalan footballer